Vltavská is a Prague Metro station on Line C, located in Holešovice, Prague 7. The station was opened on 3 November 1984 as part of the extension from Sokolovská (later renamed Florenc) to Fučíkova (later renamed Nádraží Holešovice). It is located nearby Strossmayer Square, and there are tram stations of the same name above the station.

In 2018, complex of the station Vltavská appeared on Apple Inc.'s commercial for the iPhone XR, among other Prague modern and brutalist buildings.

References 

Prague Metro stations
Railway stations opened in 1984
1984 establishments in Czechoslovakia
Prague 7
Railway stations in the Czech Republic opened in the 20th century